Shorea acuta is a species of plant in the family Dipterocarpaceae. It is endemic to Borneo.

References

acuta
Endemic flora of Borneo
Trees of Borneo
Taxonomy articles created by Polbot
Flora of the Borneo lowland rain forests